The buntings are a group of Old World passerine birds forming the genus Emberiza, the only genus in the family Emberizidae. The family contains 45 species. They are seed-eating birds with stubby, conical bills.

Taxonomy
The family Emberizidae was formerly much larger and included the species now placed in the Passerellidae (New World sparrows) and Calcariidae (longspurs and snow buntings). Molecular phylogenetic studies found that the large family consisted of distinct clades that were better treated as separate families.

The genus Emberiza is now the only genus placed in the family Emberizidae. The genus was introduced by the Swedish naturalist Carl Linnaeus in 1758 in the tenth edition of his Systema Naturae. The type species was subsequently designated as the yellowhammer (Emberiza citrinella). The genus name Emberiza is from Old German Embritz, a bunting. The origin of the English "bunting" is unknown.

A 2008 genetic study found that three emberizid species that were placed in their own monotypic genera clustered within the Emberiza. These were the crested bunting (Melophus lathami), the slaty bunting (Latouchiornis siemsseni), and the corn bunting (Miliaria calandra). All three species are now included in the genus Emberiza.

A large DNA-based study of the passerines published in 2019 found that the buntings are most closely related to the longspurs and snow buntings in the family Calcariidae.

Ornithologists Edward Dickinson and Leslie Christidis in the fourth edition of the Howard and Moore Complete Checklist of the Birds of the World chose to split up Emberiza and recognise the genera Fringillaria, Melophus, Granativora, Emberiza, and Schoeniclus. Their example has not been followed by the online version of the Handbook of the Birds of the World nor by Frank Gill and David Donsker in the list of world birds that they maintain on behalf of the International Ornithologists' Union. The British Ornithologists' Union has argued that splitting the genus provides little benefit and destabilizes the nomenclature.

Species in the New World genus Passerina include the word "bunting" in their common names, but are now classed in the family Cardinalidae.

The family is divided into four major clades. The species in Clade I are mainly African while those in Clades II to IV are Palearctic:

The above cladogram is based on a study published in 2021. The phylogenetic relationships of two African species, the brown-rumped bunting (Emberiza affinis) and Vincent's bunting (Emberiza vincenti), were not determined in the study.

List of species
The genus contains 45 species.

Extinct species have been described:
 † Long-legged bunting (Emberiza alcoveri) (Late Quaternary)
 † Emberiza shaamarica (Late Pliocene of Central Asia)
 † Emberiza polgardiensis (Upper Miocene of Hungary)
 † Emberiza media (Pliocene of Hungary)
 † Emberiza parva (Pliocene of Hungary)
 †Emberiza gaspariskii (Pliocene of Hungary)
 †Emberiza bartoki (Middle Miocene of Hungary) (Nomen dubium) 

Emberiza pannonica from the upper Miocene of Hungary is also referred to this genus, but was later found to be a member of Muscicapidae.

References

Further reading
Buntings and Sparrows - A Guide to the Buntings and North American Sparrows by Urban Olsson and Jon Curson, illustrated by Clive Byers (1995)

External links

Bunting videos, photos and sounds on the Internet Bird Collection

Bird common names
.
Finches
Taxa named by Carl Linnaeus